Tendre can refer to:
 Map of Tendre, French map of fictional country Tendre
 Mont Tendre, mountain in Jura, Switzerland
 In musical directions, tenderly; see Glossary of musical terminology#T